Vasik Rajlich (born 1971 in Cleveland, Ohio) is an International Master in chess and the author of Rybka, previously one of the strongest chess playing programs in the world. Rajlich is a dual Czechoslovakian-American citizen by birth; he was born in the United States of America to Czech parents, at that time graduate students, but grew up in Prague. He later spent years in the United States as a student, graduating from MIT.

He married Iweta (née Radziewicz) on 19 August 2006.  Iweta, who is also an International Master in chess, helps him with the development of Rybka as its tester. In April 2012, the couple was living in Budapest, Hungary and had one child, a son.

In April 2012, Rajlich participated in an April Fools' Day prank on ChessBase—claiming by using Rybka he had proven to a "99.99999999% certainty"  that the accepted King's Gambit is a draw for White, but only after 3. Be2. Rajlich later admitted on ChessBase, that, "we're still probably a good 25 or so orders of magnitude away from being able to solve something like the King's Gambit. If processing power doubles every 18 months for the next century, we'll have the resources to do this around the year 2120, plus or minus a few decades".

Rajlich's handle on the Internet Chess Club is "vrajlich".

WCCC disqualification and banning
On 28 June 2011, the International Computer Games Association (ICGA) determined that Rajlich had plagiarized two other chess software programs: Crafty and Fruit. The ICGA sanction for Vasik Rajlich and Rybka was the disqualification from the World Computer Chess Championship (WCCC) of 2006, 2007, 2008, 2009 and 2010.  Vasik Rajlich is banned for life from competing in the WCCC or any other event organized by or sanctioned by the ICGA. Rajlich had already responded to these charges with an e-mail to David Levy, president of the ICGA, in which he stated:

Notes

External links

Rybka games at ChessGames.com
UCI engines.de: Interview with Vasik Rajlich (December 2005)
SCHACH MAGAZIN 64 (May 2007) 
CHESS Magazine (May 2007)

1971 births
Living people
American chess players
Czech chess players
Chess International Masters
Computer chess people